Micrantha is a genus of moths of the family Noctuidae. The genus was erected by George Hampson in 1910.

Species
Micrantha cyclopis Hampson, 1910 Panama
Micrantha janeira (Schaus, 1904) Brazil (Rio de Janeiro)
Micrantha mirabilis (Schaus, 1904) Brazil (São Paulo)
Micrantha mollita Schaus, 1911 Costa Rica

References

Acontiinae